The BOBs (Best of the Blogs) is the world's largest international weblog competition, founded in 2004 and sponsored by Deutsche Welle, the German International Broadcasting Service. 

Through the BOBs, Deutsche Welle focuses attention on the promotion of freedom of information and the press around the world. In cooperation with Reporters Without Borders, Deutsche Welle has presented a special award to bloggers promoting these specific ideals since 2005.

Weblogs, podcasts and videoblogs from all over the world can be submitted for the BOBs in one of the following 14 languages: Arabic, Chinese, German, English, French, Indonesian, Persian, Bengali, Portuguese, Russian, Turkish, Ukrainian, Hindi and Spanish.

The BOBs were last awarded in 2016.

Award categories
The BOBs consist of 6 prize categories (all languages) and one award in each language of the competition (14 languages).

How the competition works
The BOBs presents prizes for both Jury and User's Choice awards. The User's Choice winners are chosen by worldwide online voting. The Jury prizes are awarded by a jury of international bloggers.

Blogopedia
The Blogopedia is an online catalogue featuring a growing inventory of blogs written in eleven languages. It allows the user to browse through the catalog by country, language or subject matter.

To date over 18,000 different blogs, podcasts and videoblogs have been entered into the Blogopedia by users and bloggers from all over the world.

Winners
List of winners year by year:

2004

2005

2006

2007

2008

2009–2010

2011

2012

2013

See also
 Deutsche Welle
 Reporters Without Borders

References

External links
The BOBs
Reporters without Borders 
Deutsche Welle
BOBs Blog
Sunlightfoundation Blog
Lisa Neun Blog
Aref-Adib Blog

German journalism awards
Blog awards